Man In The Moon was a spectacle on July 6, 2013 at USANA Amphitheater in West Valley City, Utah, produced by Mercury Radio Arts and its American Dream Labs, owned and operated by Glenn Beck and written by Ben McPherson.

Plot summary
The story is told from the point of view of the moon, from the beginnings of the Book of Genesis to the first moon landing. The moon serves as the narrator of the story.

The Cinematic DVD and Television
After the event, Mercury Radio Arts edited the spectacle into a "cinematic experience" and released it on DVD with the soundtrack, and premiered it on TheBlaze

External links
Official website at GlennBeck.com

Blaze Media
Independence Day (United States)
Tourist attractions in Salt Lake City
Tourist attractions in Salt Lake County, Utah